Joran Wyseure (born 9 January 2001) is a Belgian cyclist, who currently rides for UCI Continental team . He won the 2022 UCI Cyclo-cross Under-23 World Championships.

Major results

2018–2019
 Junior Brico Cross
1st Bredene
1st Lokeren
 1st Junior Gullegem
 Junior DVV Trophy
2nd Hamme
3rd Koppenberg
 Junior Superprestige
3rd Middelkerke
2019–2020
 Under-23 DVV Trophy
3rd Ronse
2021–2022
 1st  UCI World Under-23 Championships
 1st Under-23 Koksijde
 2nd Gullegem
 Stockholm Weekend
2nd Täby Park
2nd Stockholm
 3rd Overall Under-23 X²O Badkamers Trophy
1st Hamme
2nd Brussels
3rd Kortrijk
 3rd National Under-23 Championships
2022–2023
 1st Overall Under-23 X²O Badkamers Trophy
1st Koksijde
1st Hamme
1st Brussels
2nd Koppenberg
2nd Baal
2nd Herentals
3rd Kortrijk
 2nd Otegem
 3rd  Team relay, UCI World Championships

References

External links

Joran Wyseure at Cyclocross 24

2001 births
Living people
Belgian male cyclists
Cyclo-cross cyclists